Decorsea dinteri is a species of legume in the family Fabaceae. It is found only in Namibia. Its natural habitat is freshwater marshes.

References

Phaseoleae
Flora of Namibia
Least concern plants
Taxonomy articles created by Polbot
Plants described in 1913